Oligocodon is a genus of flowering plants belonging to the family Rubiaceae.

Its native range is Benin to Central Congo.

Species
Species:
 Oligocodon cunliffeae (Wernham) Keay

References

Rubiaceae
Rubiaceae genera